"The Once and Future King" is the first segment of the twenty-fifth episode, the first episode of the second season (1986–87) of the television series The Twilight Zone. This segment follows an Elvis impersonator who inadvertently goes back in time and meets the real Elvis Presley on the eve of his breakthrough into the music industry.

Plot
Gary Pitkin, an Elvis impersonator, is booked by his manager Sandra into a small hotel on the Las Vegas Strip. Gary is unsatisfied with this, and vents his frustration over his music career having degraded into lounge performances. Sandra mentions that she met the real Elvis when she was a teenager, after he picked her out of an audience. He took her back to his hotel room and said some strange things, such as that he was not really Elvis and that someone was after him.

As Gary is driving home, he gets in an accident with a crazed driver. He thumbs for a ride, and is picked up by a trucker who resembles Elvis. When he sees a newspaper on the floor dated July 3, 1954, Gary realizes that the trucker actually is Presley and that it is two days before he will record his first single.

When they arrive at Crown Electric, Elvis questions Gary about who he is. Gary uses his strong physical resemblance to Elvis and Elvis's belief in the supernatural to convince him that he is Elvis's twin brother Jesse, who died at birth. Gary tells him that he came back to help him start his legendary music career and avoid the drugs and dishonest industry figures which brought him down.

They meet the next day to rehearse the song he is going to record for Sam Phillips. Elvis starts playing the ballad "I Love You Because". Gary attempts to convince him to play a rock and roll version of "That's All Right" instead, knowing it ended up being Elvis's first single. Elvis is horrified, saying the music is "not decent". The two break into an argument that leads to a brawl. Elvis leaps towards Gary and is fatally impaled on his own broken guitar when Gary moves out of the way.

Gary buries Elvis and assumes his identity in order to make up for causing his death. The following day, Gary goes into Sun Studio and records "That's All Right".

Gary successfully recreates Elvis's career, including his 1970s encounter with Sandra. He tells her that he did all the songs and all the movies as closely as he remembered. He questions whether, had he allowed Elvis to start his career the way he wanted, the real Elvis would have been better at it than him or if he would have never introduced rock and roll at all. He says that he talks to Elvis, who tells him that he still owes him, and that he now realizes it is not enough to recreate Elvis's glory; he must experience Elvis's downfall as well. He sends her off with a kiss, and sits in front of a window facing the Vegas Strip.

Production
Much like the first segment of season one, "Shatterday", "The Once and Future King" has its lead actor (Jeff Yagher) in a dual role. However, where "Shatterday" relied on a body double for every shot where the two characters appear together, "The Once and Future King" only used body doubles in over-the-shoulder shots, and otherwise used a split screen to allow Yagher to appear as both Gary Pitkin and Elvis Presley in the same shot.

A title card appears at the end of the segment that reads: "The cooperation of the Elvis Presley Estate and Elvis Presley Enterprises is greatly appreciated." This was because the Elvis Presley Estate gave permission for the segment to be produced, something the Twilight Zone producers had not seen as a given, due to the radical nature of the story and how it depicts Presley.

Elvis's boss at the Crown Electric Company was played by Red West, Elvis's real-life bodyguard and best friend. Also, the newspaper that Gary picks up in Elvis' truck to find out the date is labeled The Commercial Appeal, the real newspaper of Memphis, Tennessee.

Elvis's vocals were performed by Ronnie McDowell, who also performed Elvis's vocals for several TV miniseries and films, including the 1979 biopic Elvis, starring Kurt Russell.

References

External links
 

The Twilight Zone (1985 TV series season 2) episodes
1986 American television episodes
Television episodes written by George R. R. Martin
Cultural depictions of Elvis Presley
Fiction set in 1954
Fiction set in the 1970s
Fiction set in 1986
Television episodes about time travel
Works about Elvis Presley
Television episodes set in the 1950s
Television episodes set in the 1970s
Television episodes set in the 1980s
Television episodes set in Las Vegas

fr:Le King